The Tyhume River is a river in Amathole District Municipality in the central part of the Eastern Cape province of South Africa.
It springs in the forested mountains of Hogsback, part of the Amatola Mountains, and runs down the Tyhume River Valley and through the eastern verge of the small town of Alice, Eastern Cape, bordering most of the Fort Hare University grounds.

After the dam, the river flows down south, then east and south-east to later join the Keiskamma River on its way to the Indian Ocean near Hamburg.

See also 
 List of rivers of South Africa
 List of dams in South Africa
 List of drainage basins of South Africa
 Water Management Areas

References 

 T. V. Bulpin: Illustrated guide to southern Africa. Reader's Digest Ass. South Africa, Cape Town 1985, 
 Robert H.W. Shepherd: Lovedale South Africa. The Story of a Century 1841-1941. Lovedale #The Lovedale Press# 1940
 Geological map of South Africa 1:250.000, Sheet 3226 King William's Town
 3226 King William's Town, 1:250.000, topo-cadastral, Mowbray #Chief Directorate Surveys and Mapping# 1985
 3226 DD Alice, topographic map 1:50 000, Mowbray #Chief Directorate Surveys and Mapping# 2002
 3226 DB Seymour, topographic map 1:50 000, Mowbray #Chief Directorate Surveys and Mapping# 2002

Rivers of the Eastern Cape